William Hedgcock (July 4, 1883 – September 29, 1947) was an American sound engineer. He was nominated for an Oscar for Best Special Effects on the film The Invisible Man Returns at the 13th Academy Awards. He worked on more than 90 films during his career.

References

External links

1883 births
1947 deaths
American audio engineers
People from New York City
Engineers from New York City